No Need to Run is the second solo release after the debut single "Hearts in Home"/"Tissues" and the first EP by producer and synaesthetic Kwes. It was released on 28 June 2010, on XL imprint Young Turks. The record has been described as a 'concoction of found sounds, synthetic noises, objects and instruments', and a 'collection of instrumental music for both mind and body'.

Track listing

External links
No Need To Run at Discogs.com
Kwes at Rough Trade Records
Music video for "In & Out The UK" by Kwes

Kwes albums
2010 EPs
Young Turks (record label) albums
Albums produced by Kwes